Margaret of Brandenburg (18 April 1453 – 27 April 1509, Hof) was a princess of Brandenburg by birth and abbess of the Poor Clares monastery at Hof from 1476 to 1490.

Life 
Margaret was the third daughter of the Elector Albrecht III Achilles, Elector of Brandenburg of Brandenburg (1414–1486) from his first marriage to Margaret of Baden (1431–1457).

She was initially intended for the monastic life.  After her mother's death, however, Margaret was betrothed to Count Palatine Kaspar of Zweibrücken.  But then Margaret fell dangerously ill and decided to dissolve her betrothal and become a nun after all.  Her younger half-sister Amalie was then betrothed to Kasper and married him in 1478.

In 1476, Margaret succeeded Catherine of Kotzau as abbess of the Poor Clares monastery at Hof.  In 1490, she abdicated and was succeeded by Agnes of Hirschberg.  She spent the rest of her life in the monastery as a nun.  She owned some land and in 1499, she created an urbarium.

References and sources 
 Friedrich Ebert: Chronik der Stadt Hof, vol. VI, Hof, 1966. p. 319.
 Julius von Minutoli: Das kaiserliche Buch des Markgrafen Albrecht Achilles, Schneider, 1850, p. 487 (Digitized)

Footnotes 

Poor Clare abbesses
German Roman Catholic abbesses
1453 births
1509 deaths
Electoral Princesses of Brandenburg
15th-century German nuns
Daughters of monarchs